Gritsenko or Hrytsenko (Ukrainian or Russian: Гриценко) is a gender-neutral Ukrainian surname that may refer to:
 Anatoliy Hrytsenko (born 1957), Ukrainian politician
 Irina Gritsenko (born 1968), Kazakhstani and French badminton player
 Marina Gritsenko (born 1980), Kazakhstani water polo player
 Nikolai Gritsenko (1912–1979), Soviet actor
 Nikolay Gritsenko (1856–1900), Russian painter
 Oleksandr Hrytsenko (1967–2020), Ukrainian poet
 Pavlo Hrytsenko (born 1950), Ukrainian linguist
 Vitalii Gritsenko (born 1985), Russian Paralympic athlete
 Yevhen Hrytsenko (born 1995), Ukrainian football goalkeeper
 Yuri Gritsenko (born 1962), Russian serial killer

See also
 
 

Ukrainian-language surnames